The Savannah Wildcats are a charter member of the Continental Basketball League based in Savannah, Georgia which began play in 2010.  They played their games at Alfred E. Beach High School during their inaugural season, but switched to Armstrong Atlantic State University for year two.  They won the league championship in their first year.

External links
Savannah Wildcats official website

References

Basketball teams in Georgia (U.S. state)
Continental Basketball League teams
Basketball teams in Savannah, Georgia
Basketball teams established in 2010
2010 establishments in Georgia (U.S. state)